Turinsky Uyezd (Туринский уезд) was one of the subdivisions of the Tobolsk Governorate of the Russian Empire. It was situated in the western part of the governorate. Its administrative centre was Turinsk.

Demographics
At the time of the Russian Empire Census of 1897, Turinsky Uyezd had a population of 68,719. Of these, 93.2% spoke Russian, 5.1% Mansi, 0.7% Ukrainian, 0.5% Siberian Tatar, 0.2% Polish, 0.1% Romani and 0.1% Komi-Zyrian as their native language.

References

 
Uezds of Tobolsk Governorate
Tobolsk Governorate